Patuxent River State Park is a public recreation area located along the upper reaches of the Patuxent River in Howard and Montgomery counties in Maryland. The state park features hunting, fishing, mountain biking, horseback riding, and hiking on unsigned and untended trails. Planning for the park began in 1963, with the Maryland General Assembly funding land purchases in each year from 1964 to 1968. It is part of the Northeastern coastal forests ecoregion.

See also
 Parks in the Baltimore–Washington Metropolitan Area

References

External links

Patuxent River State Park Maryland Department of Natural Resources
Patuxent River State Park Map Maryland Department of Natural Resources

State parks of Maryland
Parks in Howard County, Maryland
Parks in Montgomery County, Maryland
Protected areas established in 1963
1963 establishments in Maryland